19th Politburo may refer to:
 19th Politburo of the Chinese Communist Party
 Presidium of the 19th Congress of the Communist Party of the Soviet Union